This is a list of films which have placed number one at the weekend box office in the United Kingdom during 2006.

Notes

References

See also
List of British films — British films by year

2006
United Kingdom
Box office number-one films